Rivendell (also named Imladris) is a fictional place in the works of J.R.R. Tolkien.

Rivendell may also refer to:
 Radio Rivendell, an internet radio station which features mainly fantasy music from popular fantasy movies and computer games
 Rivendell Bicycle Works, a bicycle manufacturer and retailer based in Walnut Creek, California
 Rivendell Child, Adolescent and Family Unit located in Concord, NSW, Australia
 "Rivendell", a song by Rush from Fly by Night